Nigerian Baptist Convention  is a Baptist Christian denomination, affiliated with the Baptist World Alliance, in Nigeria. The office headquarters is in Ibadan, Nigeria. Rev. Dr. Israel Adélaní Àkànjí MFA is the president.

History
The Nigerian Baptist Convention has its origins in an American mission of the International Mission Board in 1849 with the appointment of Rev. Thomas Jefferson Bowen as the first missionary to the country. He arrived in Badagry area of the current Lagos State on the 5th of August, 1850. The Nigerian Baptist Convention was officially formed in 1914. It has started other Baptist conventions in West Africa notably in Ghana (now the Ghana Baptist Convention), and in Sierra Leone, now the (Baptist Convention of Sierra Leone). According to a denomination census released in 2020, it claimed 13,654 churches and 8,000,637 members.

Medical Institutions
The Nigerian Baptist Convention also operates several hospitals and medical training institutions across the country. The Baptist Medical Centre in Ogbomoso, now called Bowen University Teaching Hospital, remains one of the leading hospitals and has been in use as a university teaching hospital by the Bowen University in Iwo, since December 2009. The Nigerian Baptist Convention operates other top flight Baptist medical centres (with Schools of Nursing and Midwifery) located in Eku and Saki;  and several other minor Baptist hospitals across Nigeria. Others includes Oliveth Baptist Hospital, Oliveth heights, Oyo, Oyo State.

Schools
The Convention has 15 affiliated primary and secondary schools, gathered in the Directorate of Baptist Mission Schools. 

It has Bowen University, named in honor of Rev. Thomas Jefferson Bowen, the first American Baptist missionary from the Southern Baptist Convention. Bowen University is located at Iwo in Osun State, and is housed in the old 1,300 acre (5 km²) campus of the Baptist College, a teacher-training institution on a beautiful hill just outside the city. Bowen University opened in 2002 as a residential institution with 500 students with a current enrollment of about 3,000 students, and a target capacity of at least 5,500 students. The idea of a Nigerian Baptist university was conceived in 1938, and endorsed in 1957 by the Nigerian Baptist Convention. Bowen University is “conceived as a centre of learning and research of distinction, combining academic excellence with love of humanity, borne out of a God-fearing attitude, in accordance with the Baptist tradition of ethical behavior, social responsibility and democratic ethos”.

Theological Institutions
The Nigerian Baptist Convention operates ten theological training centers for pastors, the largest being the Nigerian Baptist Theological Seminary founded in 1898 in Ogbomoso, which grants undergraduate, masters’ and doctoral degrees. 

The theological institutions are:

 The Nigerian Baptist Theological Seminary, Ogbomoso
 Baptist Theological Seminary, Kaduna
Baptist Theological Seminary, Eku
Baptist College of Theology, Lagos
Baptist College of Theology, Oyo
Baptist College of Theology, Owerri
Baptist College of Theology, Benin City
Baptist College of Theology, Igede-Ekiti
Baptist College of Theology, Jos
Baptist Pastors' School, Gombe

See also 
 Bible
 Born again
 Baptist beliefs
 Worship service (evangelicalism)
 Jesus Christ
 Believers' Church

References

External links
 Official Website
 Baptist College of Theology, Lagos
 NBC Beliefs, Policies and Practice – Nigerian Baptist Convention

Baptist Christianity in Nigeria
Members of the World Council of Churches
Christian organizations established in 1914
Baptist denominations in Africa
Baptist denominations established in the 20th century
1914 establishments in Nigeria